Francisco Romero (ca. 1790 – ca. 1870) was an interim Mayor of Ponce, Puerto Rico, in 1847 and again in 1866.

Background
Francisco Romero came to Puerto Rico from Venezuela around 1821 and settled in Ponce, where he was a landowner. In 1836, Romero had been one of a team of three assistants to Barrio Playa mayor, Sargent Rafael Muñoz, before becoming mayor of Ponce some 10 years later.

First mayoral term (1847)
Romero was mayor of Ponce starting on 1 July 1847, and ended his mayoral term around 31 August 1847 when Juan Lacot took over.

Second mayoral term (1866)
Romero was interim corregidor mayor of Ponce starting on 1 September 1866 and ending sometime around 31 October 1866 when another interim corregidor mayor, Carlos Cabrera y Martínez, took over.

References

Notes

See also

List of Puerto Ricans
List of mayors of Ponce, Puerto Rico

Mayors of Ponce, Puerto Rico
1790s births
1870s deaths

Year of birth uncertain
Year of death uncertain